Rory Gallagher is the debut solo album by Irish blues rock musician Rory Gallagher, released in 1971. It marked his departure from the first band he formed, Taste. After disbanding Taste, Gallagher auditioned some of the best musicians available at the time. Noel Redding and Mitch Mitchell, the bassist and drummer for the Jimi Hendrix Experience, were among those considered for the new combo.  He decided on two Belfast musicians, drummer Wilgar Campbell and bass guitarist Gerry McAvoy, to be the core of his new power trio band.

Background
After practising with Jimi Hendrix's band Noel Redding, Mitch Mitchell and Belfast musicians Gerry McAvoy and Wilgar Campbell at a practice room in Fulham Road, the newly formed band with McAvoy and Campbell got underway recording in Advision Studios. With his first solo album Gallagher continued in the eclectic style that had exemplified his first band, Taste. The album begins with "Laundromat" which was to become a regular number in his live set. A blues rock song with a classic Gallagher riff, the song was inspired by the public laundromat located in the basement of his flat where he lived at the time in Earls Court.  The next song, "Just the Smile", is an acoustic number that was inspired by the British folk revival. It shows the influence of some of Gallagher's favorite English folk musicians such as Richard Thompson, Davy Graham, and Scottish guitarist Bert Jansch. (Gallagher would later go on to record with Jansch.) "I Fall Apart" has a jazz feel to it and features a guitar solo that starts slow and introspective and builds to a powerful climax. The next two songs, "Hands Up" and "Sinner Boy", were again blues rock and would also become standard numbers for his live show. "Wave Myself Goodbye" is another acoustic number, a talking blues song featuring New Orleans style piano provided by Vincent Crane from the band Atomic Rooster (Rory's brother Donal had been acting as tour manager for them). Gallagher plays saxophone in the next song, a jazz number called "Can't Believe It's True". Also recorded at the time were two blues classics, Muddy Waters' "Gypsy Woman" and "It Takes Time" by Chicago blues legend Otis Rush. Muddy Waters was a teenage hero for Gallagher; they ultimately collaborated on Muddy Waters' album The London Muddy Waters Sessions. Although these songs were left off the original album they were included in the CD release. On September 3, 2021 a 50-th anniversary edition will be released on multiple formats.

Recording
The album was recorded in Advision Studios in London. As with most of Gallagher's albums he produced it himself. The engineer was Eddie Offord, who had engineered for Gallagher on the album On the Boards with his previous band Taste.

Track listing
All tracks composed by Rory Gallagher except where indicated.

Side one
"Laundromat" – 4:38
"Just the Smile" – 3:41
"I Fall Apart" – 5:12
"Wave Myself Goodbye" – 3:30
"Hands Up" – 5:25
Side two
"Sinner Boy" – 5:04
"For the Last Time" – 6:35
"It's You" – 2:38
"I'm Not Surprised" – 3:37
"Can't Believe It's True" – 7:16
CD bonus tracks
"Gypsy Woman" – 4:02 (Muddy Waters)
"It Takes Time" – 3:34 (Otis Rush)

Personnel
Rory Gallagher – vocals, guitars, alto saxophone, mandolin, harmonica
Gerry McAvoy – bass guitar, vocals
Wilgar Campbell – drums, percussion
Vincent Crane – piano on tracks 4 & 9
Technical
Eddy Offord – engineer

Charts

References

External links
Album page on Gallagher's official web site

1971 debut albums
Rory Gallagher albums
Albums produced by Rory Gallagher
Buddah Records albums
Polydor Records albums
Chrysalis Records albums
RCA Records albums
Albums with cover art by Hipgnosis
Albums with cover art by Mick Rock